

All the Pretty People is the first collaborative EP release by the duo Christopher Norman and The Reverb Junkie (Michelle Chamuel). It was released in August 2012. In March 2013, the duo released a five track remix compilation of the EP titled All the Pretty Remixes – each track produced by a different artist.

Track listing

Personnel
Credits adapted from Bandcamp music store.

 The Reverb Junkie (Michelle Chamuel) – writer, performer, producer, vocals (tracks 1, 3-5)
 Christopher Norman – writer, performer, producer, mixing, mastering, vocals (track 2)
 Casey Clark – backup vocals (tracks 1, 5)   
 Ilya Goldberg – violin (track 3) 
 Rena Jones – viola/cello (track 3) 
 Alin Dimitriu – remix, additional production (track 4) 
 Brian Son – artwork

References

2012 EPs
Michelle Chamuel EPs